The discography of Brandi Carlile, an American singer-songwriter and producer, consists of seven studio albums, one live album, one compilation album, three demo albums, 15 extended plays, and 28 singles on RED Ink Records, Columbia Records, ATO Records, Low Country Sound, and Elektra Records.

Albums

Studio albums

Reissue albums

Live albums

Compilation albums

Demo albums

Extended plays

Singles

As lead artist

As featured artist

Other charted songs

Music videos

Collaborations 

 2008: "Already Home" (featuring Ha*Ash)
 2013: "Making believe" (featuring Willie Nelson)
 2016: "The Neverending story" (featuring Shooter Jennings)
 2016: "Angel from Montgomery" (featuring Buddy Miller)
 2017: "Cleanup Hitter" (featuring Shovels & Rope)
 2017: "Good With God" (featuring Old 97's)
 2018: "Party of One" (featuring Sam Smith)
 2018: "Travelin' Light" (Dierks Bentley featuring Brandi Carlile)
 2019: "Common" (Maren Morris featuring Brandi Carlile)
 2019: "Down to You" (featuring Joni 75)
 2019: "Beware of Darkness" (Sheryl Crow featuring Eric Clapton, Sting and Brandi Carlile)
 2019: "Finish What We Started" (Zac Brown Band featuring Brandi Carlile)
 2020: "Hold On" by Yola (provides backing vocals alongside Natalie Hemby)
 2021: "Run to Me" (Barry Gibb featuring Brandi Carlile)
 2021: "Simple Things" (Elton John featuring Brandi Carlile)
 2021: "It All Fades Away" (Jennifer Nettles featuring Brandi Carlile)
 2023: "Thousand Miles" (Miley Cyrus featuring Brandi Carlile)

Notes

References

Carlile, Brandi